Wendy Laurel Freedman (born July 17, 1957) is a Canadian-American astronomer, best known for her measurement of the Hubble constant, and as director of the Carnegie Observatories in Pasadena, California, and Las Campanas, Chile. She is now the John & Marion Sullivan University Professor of Astronomy and Astrophysics at the University of Chicago. Her principal research interests are in observational cosmology, focusing on measuring both the current and past expansion rates of the universe, and on characterizing the nature of dark energy.

Early life and career
Freedman grew up in Toronto, the daughter of a medical doctor and a concert pianist. Her early interest in science was kindled by a formative high-school physics class. This led her to the University of Toronto, where she was first a biophysics student, then an astronomy major, receiving her B.Sc. in 1979. She remained at Toronto for her graduate work, receiving a Ph.D. in astronomy and astrophysics in 1984. Joining the Carnegie Observatories in Pasadena, California, as a post-doctoral fellow in 1984, she became a faculty member of the scientific staff three years later as the first woman to join Carnegie's permanent staff. In 2003 she was named to the Crawford H. Greenewalt Chair and Director of Carnegie Observatories. Freedman's early work was principally on the Cepheid distance scale and the stellar populations of nearby galaxies.

Hubble constant
Freedman was co-leader of an international team of 30 astronomers to carry out the Hubble Space Telescope Key Project, a program aiming to establish the distance scale of the Universe and measure the current expansion rate, a quantity known as the Hubble constant. This quantity determines the size of the visible universe and is key to determining its age. Over the course of the Key Project, the team measured the distances to 24 galaxies using Cepheid variable stars, and measured the Hubble constant using five independent methods. The project's researchers, led by Freedman, published their final result in 2001. The work provided a value of the Hubble constant accurate to 10%, resolving a long-standing, factor-of-two debate.

She continues to refine her measurements of the Hubble constant using not just Cepheid variables but also the method of the tip of the red-giant branch.

Giant Magellan Telescope
Freedman initiated the Giant Magellan Telescope (GMT) Project and served as chair of the board of directors from its inception in 2003 until 2015. GMT is an international consortium of leading universities and science institutions to build a 25-meter optical telescope at the Carnegie Institution for Science's Las Campanas Observatory in the Chilean Andes. With a primary mirror  in diameter, the GMT is poised to be the world's largest ground-based telescope when it is completed. The telescope, which has entered its construction phase and is expected to become fully operational by 2034, will be able to produce images 10 times sharper than those of the Hubble Space Telescope.

Recognition

Freedman has been elected a member of the US National Academy of Sciences, the American Philosophical Society, the American Academy of Arts and Sciences, and a Fellow of the American Physical Society and a Legacy Fellow of the American Astronomical Society.

She has received several awards for her contributions to observational cosmology, including a Centennial Lectureship of the American Physical Society (1999), the John P. McGovern Award in Science (2000), the Magellanic Premium Award of the American Philosophical Society (2002) and the Marc Aaronson Lectureship and prize (1994) "in recognition of a decade of fundamental contributions to the areas of the extra galactic distance scale and the stellar populations of galaxies". In 2009 Freedman was one of three co-recipients of the Gruber Cosmology Prize. She received the 2016 Dannie Heineman Prize for Astrophysics, awarded jointly by the American Institute of Physics and the American Astronomical Society, "for her outstanding contributions and leadership role in using optical and infrared space- and ground-based observations of Cepheid stars, together with innovative analysis techniques, to greatly improve the accuracy of the cosmic distance scale and thereby constrain fundamental cosmological parameters."

She was elected a Legacy Fellow of the American Astronomical Society in 2020 

Asteroid 107638 Wendyfreedman, discovered by David Healy at the Junk Bond Observatory in 2001, was named in her honor. The official  was published by the Minor Planet Center on 6 January 2007.

Personal life
Freedman is married to longtime collaborator Barry F. Madore. They have two children.

See also 

List of women in leadership positions on astronomical instrumentation projects

References

Further reading

External links 
 The University of Chicago Academic Profile
 Oral history interview transcript with Wendy Freedman on 21 December 2020, American Institute of Physics, Niels Bohr Library & Archives
 Is There a Crisis in Cosmology? lecture given to Philosophical Society of Washington on 2020 Nov 6

1957 births
American women astronomers
Jewish Canadian scientists
Jewish astronomers
Women astrophysicists
Living people
21st-century American astronomers
20th-century Canadian astronomers
Canadian cosmologists
Members of the United States National Academy of Sciences
21st-century American women scientists
Winners of the Dannie Heineman Prize for Astrophysics
Members of the American Philosophical Society
Fellows of the American Academy of Arts and Sciences
Fellows of the American Physical Society
Fellows of the American Astronomical Society
20th-century Canadian women scientists
Scientists from Toronto